The British Rail Class 08 was the standard class of diesel locomotive designed for shunting. From 1953 to 1962, 996 locomotives were produced, making it the most numerous of all British locomotive classes. There were also 26 of the near-identical but higher-geared Class 09, and 171 similar locomotives fitted with different engines and transmissions (some of which became Class 10), which together brought the total number of outwardly-similar machines to 1193.

Since their introduction, the nature of rail freight in Britain has changed considerably, reducing or removing the need for shunting, therefore only a few Class 08 locomotives remain in service today. However, many have found an active retirement on heritage railways in Britain, with around 87 examples being classed as preserved. Another was preserved at Crewe, but scrapped in 2009. There may be more yet unregistered Class 08 shunters still working in Britain or abroad. Their low maintenance requirements means that most of them are still in operational condition, with only a small number of examples currently awaiting restoration, as of 2023.

Preserved examples

See also
 List of preserved British Rail diesel locomotives

References 

08 list
British Rail Class 08 locomotives